This is a list of top international  volleyball players.

A

 Foluke Akinradewo
 Carolina Albuquerque
 Todor Aleksiev
 Ana Ida Alvares
 Thiago Soares Alves
 Dante Amaral
 Andrea Anastasi
 Matt Anderson
 Stéphane Antiga
 Halina Aszkiełowicz
 Aleksandar Atanasijević
 Décio de Azevedo
 Wilavan Apinyapong
 Odina Bayramova

B
 Ballu
 Lloy Ball
 Petya Barakova
 Michele Baranowicz
 Michelle Bartsch-Hackley
 Andrea Bari
 Zbigniew Bartman
 Abdul Basith
 Christina Bauer
 Michał Bąkiewicz
 Bronisław Bebel
 Agnieszka Bednarek-Kasza
 Sarra Belhocine
 Regla Bell
 Izabela Bełcik
 Edwin Benne
 Alaina Bergsma
 Lorenzo Bernardi
 Franco Bertoli
 Mateusz Bieniek
 Emanuele Birarelli
 Peter Blangé
 Grzegorz Bociek
 Dante Boninfante
 Marco Bonitta
 Rob Bontje
 Ryszard Bosek
 Tijana Bošković
 Ron Boudrie
 Camila Brait
 Georgi Bratoev
 Valentin Bratoev
 Aleksa Brđović
 Hanna Busz
 Rafał Buszek
 Wanna Buakaew

C
 Fille Saint Merced Cainglet
 Lauren Carlini
 Tots Carlos
 Sheilla Castro
 Alexander Chamberlain
 Lidia Chmielnicka
 Facundo Conte
 Hugo Conte
 Albert Cristina
 Áurea Cruz
 Bethania de la Cruz 
 Konstantin Čupković
 Krystyna Czajkowska
 Patryk Czarnowski
 Micah Christenson

D
 Annie Drews
 Rachel Anne Daquis
 Neslihan Darnel
 Joel Despaigne
 Jorella Marie de Jesus
 Rhea Katrina Dimaculangan
 Gergana Dimitrova
 Nasya Dimitrova
 Kay van Dijk
 Laura Dijkema
 Eda Erdem Dündar
 Fabian Drzyzga
 Eleonora Dziękiewicz
 K. J. Kapil Dev

E
 Yukiko Ebata
 Karla Echenique
 Lisvel Elisa Eve
 Murilo Endres
 Gustavo Endres
 Yevgeniya Estes

F
 Miguel Ángel Falasca
 Kim Fajardo
 Jem Ferrer
 Strashimira Filipova
 Luiz Felipe Fonteles
 Nico Freriks
 Mai Fujii

G
 Piotr Gacek
 Victonara Galang
 Jessica Margarett Galanza
 Katarzyna Gajgał-Anioł
 Ekaterina Gamova
 Fernanda Garay
 Wiesław Gawłowski
 Jimmy George
 Dirk-Jan van Gendt
 Dzi Gervacio
 Giba
 Andrea Giani
 Simone  Giannelli
 Krzysztof Gierczyński
 Małgorzata Glinka
 Arkadiusz Gołaś
 Jovelyn Gonzaga
 Bas van de Goor
 Mike van de Goor
 Guido Görtzen
 Svetoslav Gotsev
 Rob Grabert
 Pasquale Gravina
 Nikola Grbić
 Vladimir Grbić
 Jenia Grebennikov
 Marcel Gromadowski
 Georg Grozer
 Piotr Gruszka
 Wojciech Grzyb
 Farhad Ghaemi
 Amir Ghafour
 Adel Gholami
 Kristina Guncheva

H
 Kanari Hamaguchi
 Tayyiba Haneef
 Naoko Hashimoto
 Janne Heikkinen
 Henk-Jan Held
 Kanako Hirai
 Gretchen Ho
 Dax Holdren
 Makiko Horai
 Robert Horstink
 Eri Hosoda
 Patrick Hernandez
 Amporn Hyapha
 Micha Hancock

I
 Krzysztof Ignaczak
 Ai Inden
 Akiko Ino
 Kotoe Inoue
 Kaori Inoue
 Nanami Inoue
 Yuki Ishikawa
 Yūki Ishikawa
 Evgeni Ivanov
 Marko Ivović
 Nana Iwasaka

J
 Thomas Jarmoc
 Jakub Jarosz
 Tom Joseph

K

 Joanna Kaczor
 Klaudia Kaczorowska
 Łukasz Kadziewicz
 Lukas Kampa
 Maiko Kano
 Miyuki Kano
 Mariya Karakasheva
 Marek Karbarz
 Masae Kasai
 Kyoko Katashita
 Chihiro Kato

 Yuki Kawai
 Kana Kawakami
 Megumi Kawamura
 Seiko Kawamura
 Matey Kaziyski
 Kim Yeon-koung
 Saori Kimura
 Karch Kiraly
 Marko Klok
 Karol Kłos
 Jakub Kochanowski
 Plamen Konstantinov
 Wytze Kooistra
 Grzegorz Kosok
 Michał Kubiak
 Bartosz Kurek
 Megumi Kurihara
 Malika Kanthong

L
 Jordan Larson
 Denden Lazaro
 Misha Latuhihin
 Marrit Leenstra
 Grit Lehmann
 Wilfredo Leon
 Maria Liktoras
 Dani Lins
 Srećko Lisinac
 Lucas Eduardo Lóh
 Wanitchaya Luangtonglang
 Lech Łasko
 Grzegorz Łomacz
 Mireya Luis

M
 Aiza Maizo
 Abigail Maraño
 Nicolas Marechal
 Leonel Marshall Jr.
 Niverka Marte
 Jennifer Martz
 Yuko Maruyama
 Hiroko Matsuura
 Kalei Mau
 Misty May-Treanor
 Thaisa Menezes
 Olof van der Meulen
 Brankica Mihajlović
 Aya Mikami
 Mateusz Mika
 Robert Milczarek
 Ivan Miljković
 Saki Minemura
 Joanna Mirek
 Yuko Mitsuya
 Yukari Miyata
 Isa Molde
 Jungo Morita
 Marcin Możdżonek
 Agata Mróz-Olszewska
 Dawid Murek
 Mohammad Mousavi (volleyball)
 Saeid Marouf
 Shahram Mahmoudi
 Julia Melissa Morado
 Mohammadjavad Manavinezhad

N

 Miyu Nagaoka
 Kumi Nakada
 Tomomi Nakao
 Hitomi Nakamichi
 Ikumi Narita
 Katsutoshi Nekoda
 Earvin N'Gapeth
 Barbara Niemczyk
 Nikolay Nikolov
 Vladimir Nikolov
 Mariko Nishiwaki
 Keiki Nishiyama
 Yuji Nishida
 Piotr Nowakowski
 Reinder Nummerdor
 Sidarka Núñez

O
 Motoko Obayashi
 Kim Oden
 Chiaka Ogbogu
 Maja Ognjenović
 Seiji Oko
 Tomoko Okano
 Kanako Omura
 Ai Otomo
 Kana Oyama
 Miki Oyama
 Shuka Oyama

P
 Esteban de Palma
 Kristyna Pastulova
 Chono Penchev
 Nikolay Penchev
 Rozalin Penchev
 Paula Pequeno
 Natália Pereira
 Celeste Plak
 Daniel Pliński
 Anna Podolec
 Ish Polvorosa
 Jan Posthuma
 William Priddy
 Robert Prygiel

R
 Dobriana Rabadzhieva
 Aurea Francesca Racraquin
 Prisilla Rivera
 Mika Reyes
 Bernardo Rezende
 Bruno Rezende
 Brecht Rodenburg
 Rodrigão
 Mônica Rodrigues
 Cosiri Rodríguez
 Jeoselyna Rodriguez Santos
 Cindy Rondón
 Gina del Rosario
 Milena Rosner
 Antonin Rouzier
 Michał Ruciak
 Hristina Ruseva
 Aaron Russell
 Mirosław Rybaczewski

S
 Teodor Salparov
 Kumiko Sakino
 Saori Sakoda
 Aleona Denise Santiago
 Jaja Santiago
 Sérgio Santos
 Arisa Satō
 Yuka Sakurai
 Ayako Sana
 Patcharee Sangmuang
 Yuko Sano
 Miya Sato
 Risa Sato
 Richard Schuil
 Georgi Seganov
 Avital Selinger
 Eugene Selznick
 Aki Shibata
 Takako Shirai
 Sidão
 Edward Skorek
 Katarzyna Skowrońska-Dolata
 Todor Skrimov
 Lonneke Slöetjes
 Tsvetan Sokolov
 Lyubov Sokolova (volleyball)
 Charo Soriano
 Maria Paulina Soriano
 Kim Staelens
 Clayton Stanley
 Kaoru Sugayama
 Sachiko Sugiyama
 Haruka Sunada
 Yuko Suzuki
 Grzegorz Szymański
 Magdalena Śliwa
 Dorota Świeniewicz
 Sebastian Świderski
 Onuma Sittirak

T
 Angeli Tabaquero
 Asako Tajimi
 Arisa Takada
 Midori Takahashi
 Miyuki Takahashi
 Yoshie Takeshita
 Nanae Takizawa
 Yuki Tanaka
 Masami Taniguchi
 Ran Takahashi
 Martin Teffer
 Ferdinand Tille
 Kévin Tillie
 Laurent Tillie
 Mira Todorova
 Zhana Todorova
 Logan Tom
 Nene Tomita
 Nootsara Tomkom
 Berenika Tomsia
 Kotomi Tosaki
 Jeroen Trommel
 Chie Tsuji
 Honami Tsukiji
 Yumiko Tsuzuki
 Hristo Tsvetanov
 Samuel Tuia
 Dragan Travica
 Pleumjit Thinkaow

U
 Akiko Uchida
 Nikolay Uchikov
 Mai Uemura
 Jon Uriarte
 Nicolás Uriarte
 K. Udayakumar

V
 Alyssa Valdez
 Annerys Vargas
 Elitsa Vasileva
 Leandro Vissotto
 Pieter Verhees
 Cyril C. Valloor

W

 Kerri Walsh Jennings
 Anna Werblińska
 Wanda Wiecha
 Marcin Wika
 Michał Winiarski
 Łukasz Wiśniewski
 Dominik Witczak
 Mariusz Wlazły
 Wojciech Włodarczyk
 Paweł Woicki
 Damian Wojtaszek
 Tomasz Wójtowicz
 Justine Wong-Orantes
 Andrzej Wrona

Y
 Masahiro Yanagida
 Lina Yanchulova
 Petia Yanchulova
 Eva Yaneva
 Yoshiko Yano
 Juri Yokoyama
 Masami Yokoyama
 Boyan Yordanov
 Viktor Yosifov

Z
 Paweł Zagumny
 Maciej Zajder
 Paweł Zatorski
 Mariola Zenik
 Antonina Zetova
/ Yoko Zetterlund
 Andrey Zhekov
 Dimitar Zlatanov
 Hristo Zlatanov
 Ronald Zoodsma
 Ron Zwerver
 Łukasz Żygadło
 Farhad Zarif
 Hamzeh Zarini
 Ivan Zaytsev
 Andrea Zorzi
 Zhu Ting

Volleyball